The  is Japanese aerial lift line in Yahiko, Niigata. This is the only line  operates. The company is a subsidiary of Juraku, which operates hotels and restaurants. There is Panorama Tower at the summit, a tower with the observatory that moves like a rotating elevator. The observatory has a view of Sado Island on a clear day.

Basic data
System: Aerial tramway, 3 cables
Cable length: 
Vertical interval: 
Operational speed: 3.7 m/s
Passenger capacity per a cabin: 35
Cabins: 2
Stations: 2
Duration of one-way trip: 5 minutes

See also
List of aerial lifts in Japan

External links
 Official website

Aerial tramways in Japan
1958 establishments in Japan
Yahiko, Niigata